The Great Mosque of Khost or simply the Khost Mosque is the largest mosque in the city of Khost, in southeastern Afghanistan. It can hold up to 2,000 worshipers during any prayer. 

It is important to note that the city of Khost has a number of other smaller mosques, which are also reported in the news as Khost mosques.

See also
List of mosques in Afghanistan

References

Mosques in Afghanistan
Khost